The Old Washington County Courthouse in Oklahoma is a reinforced concrete building that was built in 1913.  It was designed by P.H. Weathers in Second Renaissance Revival style.  It was listed on the National Register of Historic Places in 1981.

Washington County was founded in 1907, but it was not until 1912 that a bond issue to fund the courthouse was passed, on the third attempt.

References

Courthouses on the National Register of Historic Places in Oklahoma
Government buildings completed in 1913
Buildings and structures in Washington County, Oklahoma
County courthouses in Oklahoma
1913 establishments in Oklahoma
National Register of Historic Places in Washington County, Oklahoma